Antonio Giosa (born 21 August 1983) is an Italian football defender. He plays for Lumezzane.

Biography
On 29 June 2010 Reggina Calcio announced via their website that they have re-signed Giosa. Giosa's first words to the media where "I am really happy, I feel to be back home, the club that adopted me when I was 15. The five-year contract demonstrates the desire on my part and the club, to resume a path together" 

On 31 August 2011 he left for the third division club Lumezzane. On 3 August 2012 he was signed by Avellino.

On 2 September 2013 he left for Como in temporary deal. On 11 July 2014 he renewed his contract with Como.

In July 2016 he moved to Lecce, where he spent a season before moving to Alessandria.

In July 2018 he was signed by Potenza.  

On 20 August 2020 he agreed on a 2-year contract with Monopoli.

On 21 January 2021 he moved to Catania on a 1.5-year contract. On 30 August 2021, his Catania contract was terminated by mutual consent.

On 1 September 2021 he returned to Lumezzane in Eccellenza.

References

External links

Italian footballers
Reggina 1914 players
A.S. Cittadella players
Modena F.C. players
A.C.R. Messina players
F.C. Lumezzane V.G.Z. A.S.D. players
U.S. Avellino 1912 players
Como 1907 players
U.S. Lecce players
S.S. Monopoli 1966 players
Catania S.S.D. players
Serie A players
Serie B players
Serie C players
Association football midfielders
People from Potenza
1983 births
Living people
Sportspeople from the Province of Potenza
Footballers from Basilicata